MeHayom LeMahar ( lit. From today until tomorrow) was an Israeli current affairs news show, broadcast from 1994 to 2012 on Channel 1.

The hosts of the show were David Witzthum and Emmanuel Halperin.

See also
Mabat LaHadashot
David Witzthum
Emmanuel Halperin

Channel 1 (Israel) original programming
Israeli television news shows
1994 Israeli television series debuts
2012 Israeli television series endings